Ministerio de Ganadería, Agricultura y Pesca (MGAP)

List of Ministers of the Ministry of Livestock, Agriculture and Fisheries of Uruguay:

¹ Ministers of the Military-Civic government (1973–1985).

External links 
 Uruguayan Ministry for Public health (in Spanish only)

 
Agriculture
Agriculture ministers
Fisheries ministers
Agriculture in Uruguay